Loma Linda (Spanish for "beautiful hill") may refer to:

 Loma Linda, California
Loma Linda Academy
Loma Linda University
Loma Linda University Church
Loma Linda University Medical Center
 Loma Linda, Missouri
 Loma Linda East, Texas
 Loma Linda Foods